Baron Gwydyr, of Gwydyr in the County of Carnarvon, was a title in the Peerage of Great Britain. It was created on 16 June 1796 for Sir Peter Burrell, 2nd Baronet, who had earlier represented Boston and Haslemere in the House of Commons. The Burrell Baronetcy, of West Grinstead Park in the County of Sussex, had been created in the Baronetage of Great Britain on 5 July 1766 for his great-uncle Merrik Burrell, with remainder to the latter's nephew Peter Burrell (the father of Lord Gwydyr). Merrik Burrell had previously represented Marlow, Grampound, Haslemere and Great Bedwyn in Parliament. Lord Gwydyr married Priscilla Bertie, 21st Baroness Willoughby de Eresby, herself a descendant of the Aberffraw legacy through her grandmother Mary Wynn. They were both succeeded by their eldest son, Peter Drummond-Burrell, 22nd Baron Willoughby de Eresby. On the death in 1865 of his son, the two titles separated. The Barony of Willoughby de Eresby fell into abeyance between the late Baron's sisters (see the Baron Willoughby de Eresby for later history of this title) while the baronetcy and barony of Gwydyr were inherited by his cousin, the fourth Baron. He was the son of the Honourable Lindsey Merrik Peter Burrell, younger son of the first Baron. The baronetcy and barony became extinct on the death of his son, the fifth Baron, on 13 February 1915.

The first Baron Gwydyr was the nephew of Sir William Burrell, 2nd Baronet, from whom the Burrell baronets of Valentine Park are descended.

Gwydyr Mansions in Hove, East Sussex, were named after the 2nd Lord Gwydyr.  He had been a friend of the Goldsmid family, upon whose land the development was built in 1890.

Gwydyr House in London was the town-house of the Barons, now hosts the Office of the Secretary of State for Wales

Burrell baronets, of West Grinstead Park (1766)
Sir Merrik Burrell, 1st Baronet (1699–1787)
Sir Peter Burrell, 2nd Baronet (1754–1820) (created Baron Gwydyr in 1796)

Barons Gwydyr (1796)
Peter Burrell, 1st Baron Gwydyr (1754–1820) 
Peter Robert Drummond-Burrell, 2nd Baron Gwydyr, 22nd Baron Willoughby de Eresby (1782–1865) 
Albyric Drummond-Willoughby, 3rd Baron Gwydyr, 23rd Baron Willoughby de Eresby (1821–1870)
Peter Robert Burrell, 4th Baron Gwydyr (1810–1909)
Willoughby Merrik Campbell Burrell, 5th Baron Gwydyr (1841–1915)

See also
Baron Willoughby de Eresby
Burrell baronets, of Valentine Park
Peter Burrell (1692–1756)
Peter Burrell (1724–1775)

References

Extinct baronies in the Peerage of Great Britain
Noble titles created in 1796